This is a list of people executed in the United States in 2012. Forty-three people were executed in the United States in 2012. Fifteen of them were in the state of Texas.

List of people executed in the United States in 2012

Demographics

Executions in recent years

See also
 List of death row inmates in the United States
 List of most recent executions by jurisdiction
 List of people scheduled to be executed in the United States

References

List of people executed in the United States in 2012
Executed in the United States in 2012
People executed in the United States
Executed in the United States in 2012
2012